Andrew Stewart Brown (born 11 October 1976) is a Scottish former footballer who played for Clydebank, Dumbarton, Stenhousemuir and Alloa Athletic.

References

External links

1976 births
Scottish footballers
Dumbarton F.C. players
Clydebank F.C. (1965) players
Stenhousemuir F.C. players
Alloa Athletic F.C. players
Scottish Football League players
Living people
Footballers from Edinburgh
Leeds United F.C. players
Strømsgodset Toppfotball players
Hull City A.F.C. players
English Football League players
Association football forwards
St Johnstone F.C. players